The Thai Ambassador in New Delhi is the official representative of the Government in Bangkok to the Government of India.

List of representatives

See also
 India–Thailand relations
 Embassy of Thailand New Delhi, former-ambassadorsRELATIONSHIPS BETWEEN THAILAND AND INDIA

References 

Royal Thai Embassy New Delhi

 
India
Thailand